John-Andrew Kambanis (born 10 December 1972) is a Greek bobsledder. He competed at the 1998 Winter Olympics and the 2002 Winter Olympics.

References

1972 births
Living people
Greek male bobsledders
Olympic bobsledders of Greece
Bobsledders at the 1998 Winter Olympics
Bobsledders at the 2002 Winter Olympics
Sportspeople from Athens